Savage Grace is a 2007 drama film directed by Tom Kalin and written by Howard A. Rodman, based on the book Savage Grace by Natalie Robins and Steven M.L. Aronson. The story is based on the highly dysfunctional relationship between heiress and socialite Barbara Daly Baekeland and her son, Antony. The film stars Julianne Moore, Stephen Dillane, Eddie Redmayne, Elena Anaya, and Hugh Dancy.

It was an official selection at the 2007 London Film Festival, the 2007 Sundance Film Festival and the 2007 Cannes Film Festival.

Plot
The film is based on the true story of Barbara Daly Baekeland (Moore), her husband Brooks Baekeland (Dillane), heir to the Bakelite plastics fortune, and their only child Antony (Redmayne), who was diagnosed with schizophrenia. The story begins with Antony's birth and follows the family to the time of his arrest for the murder of his mother.

Critical reception
Critics gave the film mixed reviews. The review aggregator Rotten Tomatoes has a 38% of approval, based on 89 reviews — the consensus reads "though visually compelling, the lamentable characters in Savage Grace make for difficult viewing." Metacritic, another review aggregator, reported the film had an average score of 51 out of 100, based on 28 reviews.

Peter Bradshaw writing in The Guardian gave the film four out of five stars, describing it as "a gripping, coldly brilliant and tremendously acted movie."

Accolades
Savage Grace was nominated for an Independent Spirit Award for Best Screenplay in 2008.

Sam Green
After the film opened, Baekeland's former lover, Samuel Adams Green (played by Dancy in the film), wrote an article pointing out that elements in the film were factually inaccurate, such as the ménage à trois scene of Barbara, Antony, and Sam having sex.

Green then took legal action against the film makers, which was still unresolved at the time of his death.

References

External links
 
 
 

2007 films
2000s biographical films
2007 crime drama films
2007 LGBT-related films
American biographical films
American crime drama films
American LGBT-related films
Drama films based on actual events
2000s English-language films
Fictional portrayals of schizophrenia
Films about dysfunctional families
Films set in France
Films set in London
Films set in New York City
Films set in the 1940s
Films set in the 1950s
Films set in the 1960s
Films set in the 1970s
Films shot in Barcelona
Films shot in France
Films shot in London
Films shot in Spain
French crime drama films
English-language French films
French LGBT-related films
Incest in film
LGBT-related drama films
Spanish crime drama films
English-language Spanish films
Spanish LGBT-related films
Crime films based on actual events
Films produced by Christine Vachon
Killer Films films
Films scored by Fernando Velázquez
Films about mother–son relationships
2000s American films
2000s French films